Camu may refer to the following people:
Camu Tao (Tero Smith, 1977–2008), American rapper and producer 
Arnoldo Camu (died 1973), Chilean lawyer and political activist 
Pierre Camu (born 1923), Canadian geographer, civil servant, academic, and transport executive
Renée Camu (born 1936), French rower 

French-language surnames